The 1997–98 season was the sixth season in the history of Newcastle Breakers. It was also the sixth season in the National Soccer League.

Players

Competitions

Overview

National Soccer League

League table

Results summary

Results by round

Matches

Statistics

Appearances and goals
Players with no appearances not included in the list.

Clean sheets

References

Newcastle Breakers FC seasons